Massimiliano Marsili (born 14 July 1987) is an Italian professional footballer who plays for Serie D club Casarano.

Biography
Marsili made one appearance for Roma in Serie A at the age of 17, playing 36 minutes against Udinese on April 10, 2005. He was signed by Cosenza Calcio 1914 on 25 August 2009 in co-ownership deal. In June 2010 Roma gave up the remain 50% registration rights to Cosenza for free.

In 2010, he was signed by A.S.G. Nocerina. In January 2012 he left for Andria.

In 2012, he was signed by Martina of Serie C2.

In 2013, he was signed by Serie D club Brindisi. In December 2013 he was signed by fellow Serie D club Matera. In 2017, he was signed by A.S.D. Nocerina 1910 of Serie D.

After a season in Serie D with Taranto he joined Carrarese on a free transfer.

On 20 July 2022, Marsili moved to Casarano.

Honours
 Coppa Italia winner: 2006–07.

References

External links

Italian footballers
Italy youth international footballers
A.S. Roma players
Taranto F.C. 1927 players
Modena F.C. players
Cosenza Calcio players
S.S. Fidelis Andria 1928 players
A.S.G. Nocerina players
A.S. Martina Franca 1947 players
S.S.D. Città di Brindisi players
S.S. Racing Club Fondi players
Carrarese Calcio players
Serie A players
Serie B players
Serie C players
Serie D players
1987 births
Living people
Association football midfielders